The 2003 Oklahoma State Cowboys football team represented Oklahoma State University during the 2003 NCAA Division I-A football season. They participated as members of the Big 12 Conference in the South Division. They played their home games at Boone Pickens Stadium in Stillwater, Oklahoma. They were coached by head coach Les Miles.

Schedule

Game summaries

SMU

Source: ESPN

Kansas

    
    
    
    
    
    
    
    
    
    
    
    

Vernand Morency, starting in place for an injured Tatum Bell, rushed for a career-best 269 yards and three touchdowns.

References

Oklahoma State
Oklahoma State Cowboys football seasons
Oklahoma State Cowboys football